Steven Van McHone (March 23, 1970 – November 11, 2005) was a murderer executed by the U.S. state of North Carolina. He was convicted of killing his mother, Mildred Johnson Adams, and stepfather Wesley Dalton Adams Sr. on June 3, 1990 in Surry County, North Carolina.

Crime
Steven McHone's stepbrother Wesley Adams Jr. and his wife Wendy were visiting Wesley Adams Sr. and his wife, Mildred. Just after midnight on June 3, McHone was heard arguing with the couple by Wesley Jr. and Wendy, who were in bed. Mildred Adams entered their room and asked if they had moved a handgun that was in the house. They replied that they hadn't and she left and closed the door. Before Wesley Jr. could get dressed, three shots were heard. Wendy said she heard the elder Wesley tell her husband to call 9-1-1. Wesley Jr. saw his father and stepbrother wrestling and McHone was holding a handgun. Wesley Jr. managed to disarm McHone but then when he returned to the phone, the wrestling resumed and then the two headed out of sight of him, up a hallway. His father returned about a minute later saying that his stepmother was "facedown out back." McHone reappeared carrying a shotgun, raising it into a firing position. His stepfather moved towards him and attempted to grab the gun, but McHone fired, throwing Wesley Sr. with such force that he hit and knocked down Wesley Jr. McHone and Wesley Jr. struggled again, with McHone cursing Wesley Jr. and crying, asking Wesley Jr. to shoot McHone for what he had done.

The first response team arrived at the scene and found Wesley Sr. dead with a large chest wound, and Mildred Adams alive, but with a gunshot wound to the head. About 2 a.m., a deputy sheriff with the Surry County Sheriff's Department arrived and McHone was placed into a patrol car. The deputy sheriff would testify that although he smelled alcohol on McHone's breath, he did not believe that he was drunk to the point of not being aware of his actions and the consequences.

Execution
McHone was sentenced to death on March 7, 1991.

His appeals centered on the fact he was under the influence of alcohol and possibly other drugs at the time of the murders. Voluntary intoxication is a defense to a capital indictment under North Carolina state law. Also the trial counsel had failed to object to inappropriate statements of the prosecutor and unsatisfactory jury instruction.

On November 9, 2005, the execution had been stayed after Surry County Superior Court Judge Anderson Cromer had agreed to hear testimony from paramedic Teresa Durham, who said in an affidavit that Mildred Adams had said McHone had not shot her. This ruling was overturned by the North Carolina Supreme Court the next day, without reason, in their one page decision.

Clemency was denied by Governor Mike Easley on November 10 and McHone's appeal to the Supreme Court of the United States was denied without comment. Easley had met with the family of McHone, some of whom wished that he not be executed.

For his last meal he ordered medium rare porterhouse steak, steak fries, chocolate cheese cake, and a 20 oz. Mountain Dew. After entering the execution chamber strapped to a gurney at 1:50 a.m. EST, he did not make an official final statement but did appear to say "I'm so sorry" to his stepbrother. McHone then exchanged smiles and laughter with his attorney and with two friends, who were among nine people who served as official witnesses.

At about 2 a.m., executioners added a sedative to McHone's intravenous lines. He closed his eyes within two minutes and appeared to be asleep. Two lethal chemicals were added, and at 2:05 a.m. McHone's torso shook quickly and his face became pale. He appeared not to move afterward. He was pronounced dead at 2:10 a.m..

Wesley Adams Jr. released a statement after the execution:
"We have sympathy and pray for comfort for those who will grieve Steve's passing. We do, however, feel that justice was upheld and that this fate was sealed many years ago. We feel that the enforcement of duly deliberated and prescribed sentences send a stronger message, as to the sanctity of human life, than does the sparing of those who have taken life willfully and brutally."

See also
 Capital punishment in North Carolina
 Capital punishment in the United States
 List of people executed in North Carolina
 List of people executed in the United States in 2005

General references
 
 
 Report from the National Coalition to Abolish the Death Penalty 
 Offender Data Screen from North Carolina Department of Correction

People from Surry County, North Carolina
American people convicted of murder
People executed for murder
21st-century executions of American people
21st-century executions by North Carolina
1970 births
2005 deaths
People executed by North Carolina by lethal injection
People convicted of murder by North Carolina